This is a list of films in the German language. For a more comprehensive list see :Category:German-language films
10 Sekunden, 2008
2030 – Aufstand der Alten, 2007
2030 – Aufstand der Jungen, 2010
3 Engel für Ali, 2003
89 Millimeter, 2005
Ab Morgen, 2011, a short film
Abschied von gestern, 1966
Absolute Giganten (Gigantic), 1999 
Advertising Rules! (Viktor Vogel – Commercial Man), 2001
Agnes and His Brothers (Agnes und seine Brüder), 2004
Aguirre: The Wrath of God (Aguirre, der Zorn Gottes), 1972
Aimée and Jaguar (Aimée und Jaguar), 1999
The American Friend (Der amerikanische Freund), 1977
Der amerikanische Soldat, 1970
Anatomy, 2000
The Baader Meinhof Complex, 2008
Barfuss, 2005
Berlin Blues (Herr Lehmann), 2003
Der bewegte Mann (Maybe, Maybe Not), 1994
The Bitter Tears of Petra von Kant (Die Bitteren Tränen der Petra von Kant), 1972
The Blindflyers (Die Blindgänger), 2004
The Blue Light (Das Blaue Licht), 1932
Blueprint, 2003
Das Boot, 1981 (150 minutes; Director's Cut of 1997: 208 minutes)
The Cabinet of Dr. Caligari (Das Cabinet des Dr. Caligari), 1920
Coming Home (Mein Vater), 2003
Coming Out, 1989
Christiane F. (Christiane F. - Wir Kinder vom Bahnhof Zoo), 1981
Day 26 (Tag 26), 2002, a short film
Deutschland im Jahre Null, 1948
Distant Lights (Lichter), 2003
Doctor Praetorius (Frauenarzt Dr. Prätorius), 1950
Downfall (Der Untergang)
The Edukators (Die fetten Jahre sind vorbei)
Elementarteilchen (Atomized)
Finsterworld, 2013
En Route (Unterwegs)
The Enigma of Kaspar Hauser (Jeder für sich und Gott gegen alle)
Enlightenment Guaranteed (Erleuchtung garantiert, 2000)
Das Erdbeben in Chili, 1975
Europa, 1991
Even Dwarfs Started Small (Auch Zwerge haben klein angefangen, 1970)
Das Experiment, 2001
 Felidae, 1994
Fack ju Göhte, 2013
Fack ju Göhte 2, 2015
Faust (Faust – eine deutsche Volkssage), 1926
Fear Eats the Soul (Angst essen Seele auf), 1974
Das Fest des Huhnes (Festival of the Chicken), 1992
Fitzcarraldo, 1982
Flügel und Fesseln, 1984
Football Under Cover, 2008
Four for Venice (2 Männer, 2 Frauen - 4 Probleme!?)
Germany, Pale Mother (Deutschland bleiche Mutter, 1980)
Getting My Brother Laid (Mein Bruder, der Vampir)
Go for Zucker! (Alles auf Zucker!)The Goalkeeper's Fear of the Penalty, 1972Good Bye Lenin!Götter der Pest, 1970Grave Decisions (Wer früher stirbt ist länger tot), 2006Grosse Freiheit Nr. 7, 1944Harte Jungs, 2000Head-On (Gegen die Wand)Heart of GlassHeimat (Heimat - Eine deutsche Chronik), 1984; 
 Leaving Home (Die Zweite Heimat - Chronik einer Jugend), 1992; 
 Heimat 3 - Chronik einer Zeitenwende, 2004 Heller Wahn, 1983Hippie Masala, 2006Hitler, ein Film aus Deutschland, 1977Hundstage, 2001If It Don't Fit, Use a Bigger Hammer, 2002Im toten WinkelIn July (Im Juli, 2000)In Diesem Moment (Im Dec, 2013)Journey Into BlissDer junge TörlessKatze im SackKatzelmacher, 1969KlassenverhältnisseKleinruppin forever, 2004Lammbock, 2001L'Animale, 2018Lessons of Darkness (Lektionen in Finsternis, 1992)The Lives of Others (Das Leben der Anderen)Liebe ist kälter als der Tod, 1969Life is All You Get (Das Leben ist eine Baustelle, 1997)Lola, 1981Love in Thoughts (Was nützt die Liebe in Gedanken)Lulu, 1962M, 1931The Legend of Paul and Paula (Die Legende von Paul und Paula)The Man (Der Typ)Men Like Us (Männer wie wir)The Marriage of Maria Braun (Die Ehe der Maria Braun)Mein Herz – niemandem!, 1997Mephisto, 1981The Miracle of Bern (Das Wunder von Bern)Mostly Martha (Bella Marta)The Net (Das Netz)Netto (Die Nacht singt ihre Lieder)No Mercy, No Future (Die Berührte), 1981Nowhere in Africa (Nirgendwo in Afrika)Oi! Warning, 1999Pappa ante Portas, 1991The Princess and the Warrior (Der Krieger und die Kaiserin)Das Versprechen, 1995The Red Jacket (Die rote Jacke)Toni Erdmann, 2016Razzia in Sankt Pauli, 1932Requiem, 2006Roma città aperta, 1945Rosa Luxemburg, 1986RosenstrasseRun Lola Run (Lola rennt)Die ScheinheiligenDas schreckliche Mädchen (The Nasty Girl) 1989Schultze Gets the BluesSchwestern oder Die Balance des Glücks, 1979Die Sehnsucht der Veronika Voss, 1982SonnenalleeSophie Scholl: The Final Days (Sophie Scholl – Die letzten Tage)The Sons of the Great Mother Bear (Die Söhne der großen Bärin)Soul Kitchen 2009StroszekSummer Storm (Sommersturm, 2004)The Tin Drum (Die Blechtrommel, 1979)The Third Generation (Die Dritte Generation, 1979)This Very Moment (Milchwald)Triumph of the Will (Triumph des Willens), 1935Tornado (2007)Unsichtbare Gegner, 1977Unter dem Pflaster ist der Strand, 1975Verfolgt, 2006Warnung vor einer heiligen Nutte, 1971Die Welle (The Wave), 2008What To Do In Case Of Fire (Was Tun, Wenn's Brennt)When We Leave (Die Fremde, 2010)Das wilde LebenWho Am I – No System Is Safe (Who Am I – Kein System ist sicher, 2014)Wings of Desire (Himmel über Berlin)Das zweite Erwachen der Christa Klages'', 1978

 
Lists of films by language